This is a List of notable Old Boys of Waverley College Sydney, they being notable former students – known as "Waverlians" – of the Waverley College, an independent, non-selective Roman Catholic day school located in Waverley, New South Wales, Australia.

Business
Ezra Norton, newspaper proprietor (also attended Scots College)

Clergy
 Patrick Dougherty (1931–2010), Bishop Emeritus and Bishop of the Diocese of Bathurst, from 1983 until his death in 2010

Law
 Barry O'Keefe , judge in the Supreme Court of New South Wales and former commissioner of the NSW Independent Commission Against Corruption
 Charles Waterstreet, Sydney barrister and author

Media, entertainment and the arts
 Scott Cam, TV personality with the Nine Network
 Sam de Brito, journalist and blogger for The Sydney Morning Herald
 Bruce Dellit, architect, pioneer of the Art Deco style
 Costa Georgiadis, television host for ABC TV Gardening Australia
 Robert Grasso, Head of Sport SBS World News
 Damien Lovelock, singer and sports commentator
 John McKellar, playwright and social satirist
 Justin Melvey, television actor (Home and Away, Days of Our Lives)
 Johnny O'Keefe, Australian rock singer of the 1950s, 1960s and 1970s
 Kevin Kearney, Film Producer, Sound Designer, Location Sound Recordist : 1960-2015 <IMDb>

Military
 Peter Cosgrove , 26th Governor-General of Australia (2014–2019); Chief of the Defence Force (2002–04); Chancellor of the Australian Catholic University (2005–14)
 Bede Kenny  (1896–1953), recipient of the Victoria Cross

Politics
 Peter Collins , former leader of the New South Wales Liberal Party, deputy premier and treasurer
 John Murphy, Australian Labor politician who served as a member of the Australian House of Representatives from 1998 until 2013, representing Lowe and then Reid
 Bill Tilley, Victorian politician and member for Benambra (also attended St Gregory's College, Campbelltown & Redden College)

Public and community service
 John McCarthy , Australian diplomat, ambassador, High Commissioner
 Patrick McClure , civil society leader, CEO Mission Australia (1997–2006) (also attended St Peter's College, Auckland)
 James O'Brien (Born 1947)  CEO Wheelchair Sports NSW/ACT (1999-2019)

Sport
 Nick Blakey- AFL Footballer Sydney Swans
 Dylan Brown, former rugby league footballer, played for Eastern Suburbs, and named as the youngest ever Australian test captain.
 Michael Cleary , former rugby union, and rugby league and footballer of the 1950s, 1960s, and 1970s, Commonwealth Games sprint competitor and politician as Minister for Sport in the Wran Government (1981–88)
 Clay Cross, Australian shot putter and competitor in the 1998, 2002 and 2006 Commonwealth Games
 Ryan Cross, Australian rugby union, and rugby league footballer of the 1990s, 2000s, and 2010
 Tom English, rugby union professional player for the Melbourne Rebels
 Gordon Benjamin Favelle (1912–1987), Australian professional rugby league footballer of the 1930s.
 Adam Freier, broadcaster and former rugby union professional player
 Jack Fingleton , former Australian cricketer, journalist and political commentator
 Isaac Heeney, Australian Rules Football player at the Sydney Swans
 Stephen Hoiles, professional Rugby Union player, Wallaby and Fox Sports commentator
 Kenneth Kennedy, speed skater and ice hockey player, Australia's first Winter Olympian
 Massimo Luongo, footballer, Australian Socceroo representative, Queens Park Rangers and formerly of Swindon Town F.C.
 Shawn Mackay, Super Rugby and Commonwealth Games Rugby 7s player
 Tony Madigan, Olympic Games boxing bronze medallist
 Kyle McBride- NFL Line Backer New England Patriots, and CAS 1'st XV Rugby all time leading try scorer
 Patrick Phibbs, rugby union player
 Sam Talakai, rugby union player
 Morgan Turinui, rugby union player
 Anatoly Kolesnikov, basketball player
 Jason Sangha-cricketer

Controversies
TBC

See also
 Combined Associated Schools

References

External links
 Waverley College website

Waverley
Waverley
Waverley Old Boys